Tonkatsu sauce or katsu sauce is a Japanese sauce served with tonkatsu (pork cutlet). It is a thick (viscosity over 2.0 pascal-second, per JAS Standard) Japanese Worcestershire-type sauce. It is similar to a brown sauce (British Isles), and can include a fish sauce, tomatoes, prunes, dates, apples, lemon juice, carrots, onions, and celery among its ingredients.

History and varieties 
The first tonkatsu sauce was made in 1948 by Oliver Sauce Co., Ltd. of Hyogo Prefecture. 
The Bull-Dog brand of tonkatsu sauce, for example, is made from malt vinegar, yeast, and vegetable and fruit purees, pastes, and extracts.
 In the United States, Kikkoman brand sells a fruity tonkatsu sauce with applesauce as the main ingredient.

See also
 Soy sauce
 Tare sauce
 Japanese mayonnaise
 Japanese Worcestershire sauce

References

Japanese condiments